Xiphogymnites is an extinct ammonoid cephalopod genus from the Triassic included in the family Gymnitidae. It is known from the Balkans in eastern Europe.

The shell is similar to that of Gymnites,  smooth, evolute, whorl section oval, venter arched, suture ammonitic, except that it has a row of tubercles on the venter followed by constrictions. Both genera are included in the Pinacoceratoidea.

References
 Arkell, et al., Mesozoic Ammonoidea, Treatise on Invertebrate Paleontology Part L (1957) Geological Society of America.
 E. T. Tozer. 1981. Triassic Ammonoidea: Classification, evolution and relationship with Permian and Jurassic Forms. The Ammonoidea: The evolution classification, mode of life and geological usefulness of a major fossil group. 
Xiphogymnites in the Paleobiology database 8/31/13

Gymnitidae
Ceratitida genera
Triassic ammonites
Ammonites of Europe